Marc Lotz (born 19 October 1973 in Valkenburg) is a Dutch former racing cyclist. Lotz reportedly took the substance to help him at the 2005 Tour de France which he never ended up riding.

Major results

1994
 2nd Ronde van Limburg (Netherlands)
1996
 1st  Overall Flèche du Sud
 2nd Ronde van Limburg (Netherlands)
1997
 1st Brussels Opwijk
 1st Stage 5 Ster ZLM Toer
 2nd Kattekoers
 8th Overall Circuito Montañés
1st Stage 9
2001
 6th Brabantse Pijl
2002
 3rd Clásica de Almería
 10th Rund um den Henninger Turm
2003
 5th Clásica de Almería
2004
 1st Tour du Haut Var
 6th Brabantse Pijl
2005
 2nd Brabantse Pijl
 8th Trofeo Calvià

Grand Tour general classification results timeline

References

1973 births
Living people
Dutch male cyclists
Doping cases in cycling
Dutch sportspeople in doping cases
Sportspeople from Valkenburg aan de Geul
Cyclists from Limburg (Netherlands)